Nitidulini is a tribe of sap-feeding beetles in the family Nitidulidae. There are about 10 genera and at least 20 described species in Nitidulini.

Genera
These 10 genera belong to the tribe Nitidulini:
 Aethina Erichson, 1843 i c g b
 Amphotis Erichson, 1843 i c g b
 Lobiopa Erichson, 1843 i c g b
 Nitidula Fabricius, 1775 i c g b
 Omosita Erichson, 1843 i c g b
 Phenolia Erichson, 1843 i c g b
 Pocadius Erichson, 1843 i c g b
 Soronia Erichson, 1843 i c g b
 Stelidota Erichson, 1843 i c g b
 Thalycra Erichson, 1843 i c g b
Data sources: i = ITIS, c = Catalogue of Life, g = GBIF, b = Bugguide.net

References

Further reading

External links

 

Nitidulidae